Ataur Rahman Khan is a Bangladesh Awami League politician and the incumbent Jatiya Sangsad member from Tangail-3 constituency. His brother, Shamsur Rahman Khan Shahjahan, and his son, Amanur Rahman Khan Rana, were the members from same constituency earlier parliaments.

Career
Khan was elected to parliament from Tangail-3 as a Bangladesh Awami League candidate 30 December 2018.

References

Living people
Awami League politicians
11th Jatiya Sangsad members
Place of birth missing (living people)
Date of birth missing (living people)
Year of birth missing (living people)
People from Tangail District
20th-century Bengalis
21st-century Bengalis